A five-man band out of Boston, MA, Swinging Steaks were a roots rock/alternative country group. Original band members are:
Tim Giovanniello -  Vocals, Guitar, Lap Steel
Jamie Walker -  Vocals, Guitar, Mandolin, Slide
Jim Gambino - Vocals, Piano, Organ
Paul Kochanski - Vocals, Electric and Upright Bass
Joe Donnelly - Vocals, Drums, Percussion
 
The Swinging Steaks were formed in the late 1980s by former members of The Drive and friends. In 1991 they participated in the WBCN Rock & Roll Rumble. The Swinging Steaks' second album, Southside of the Sky (1993, Capricorn Records) introduced the band to a national audience with two top ten AAA radio singles and appearances on NBC-TV's Late Night with Conan O'Brien and NPR's Mountain Stage. Their four self-released albums, Suicide at the Wishing Well, Shiner, the live, acoustic Bare, and KickSnareHat have continued to expose the group to new audiences and garner them appearances at SXSW, CMJ Music Marathon and Nashville Extravaganza.

Creem magazine called them: "the best country-rock out of Boston since Harvard student Gram Parsons put together his International Submarine Band"

In 2005 the band released "Sunday Best" on First National Records in the U.S. and Blue Rose in Europe.

The band's name apparently comes from a restaurant in Mexican Hat, UT, called The Mexican Hat Lodge that bills itself as the "Home Of The Swinging Steak".

Discography
Suicide at the Wishing Well
Southside of the Sky, 1993, Capricorn Records
Orphans of God, tribute to Mark Heard, 1996
Shiner
Bare
KickSnareHat
Sunday Best     
Live in '93

External links 
 http://swingingsteaks.com/
 https://www.facebook.com/Swinging-Steaks-96033109578/

Rock music groups from Massachusetts
Musical groups from Boston